The Communist Party of Nepal (Marxist) was a Nepalese political party. It was formed on 1 November 1991 by a group of former leaders of the original Communist Party of Nepal (Marxist) that had been expelled from the Communist Party of Nepal (Unified Marxist–Leninist). Initially, it was known as the Communist Party of Nepal (15 September 1949) but took the name Communist Party of Nepal (Marxist) after approximately one year of existence. Prabhunaryan Chaudhary was the chairman of the party.

History 
Ahead of the 1992 Nepalese local elections, the CPN (15 September 1949) took part in forming a front together with the Samyukta Janamorcha Nepal, Nepal Workers Peasants Party, Communist Party of Nepal (Marxist–Leninist–Maoist), and Nepal Communist League.

In the 1994 Nepalese general election, it had 49 candidates and polled 0.39% of the votes nationwide. In the 1999 Nepalese general election, it had 28 candidates, and got 0.094% of the votes nationwide. The students wing of the party was called Nepal Progressive Students Union and its trade union was the Nepal Trade Union Centre (NTUC). On 6 April, a major chunk of its membership (5.153) joined the CPN (UML).

In 2005, the party merged with the Communist Party of Nepal (United) and formed the Communist Party of Nepal (United Marxist).

Electoral performance

See also 
 History of Nepal
 List of communist parties in Nepal
 Politics of Nepal

References

Defunct communist parties in Nepal
Political parties established in 1991
1991 establishments in Nepal
Political parties disestablished in 2005
2005 disestablishments in Nepal
ja:ネパール共産党マルクス主義派 (1986-1991)